The Macclesfield Express is a weekly newspaper for and about people who live and work in the Macclesfield area of Cheshire. It comes out on Wednesdays and can be bought in all local newsagents.

The paper is available online.  It is published by M.E.N. Media and printed by Trinity Mirror, both in Oldham.

References

External links
 

Newspapers published in Cheshire
Newspapers published by Reach plc